Audrey Macklin is a Canadian scholar of immigration law and the Rebecca Cook Chair in Human Rights Law at the University of Toronto Faculty of Law. She is also the director of the University of Toronto's Centre for Criminology and Sociolegal Studies.

Macklin was a Pierre Elliott Trudeau Foundation fellow in 2017. As of 2020, she is a fellow of the Canadian Institute for Advanced Research.

Macklin received a BSc from the University of Alberta, an LLB from the University of Toronto Faculty of Law, and an LLM from Yale Law School. Before her academic career, Macklin clerked for Justice Bertha Wilson of the Supreme Court of Canada. Macklin was a professor at the Schulich School of Law at Dalhousie University from 1991 to 2000, when she was appointed to a position at the University of Toronto. In the mid-1990s, she was a member of the Immigration and Refugee Board of Canada.

In 2017, Macklin delivered testimony to a committee of the Senate of Canada regarding proposed amendments to the Citizenship Act. In 2019, she represented the University of Toronto Faculty of Law's International Human Rights Program before the Supreme Court of Canada in Nevsun Resources Ltd v Araya, a case involving the liability of a Canadian firm for alleged breaches of international law abroad.

Selected publications

References

External links 
 Profile at the University of Toronto Faculty of Law

Academic staff of the University of Toronto Faculty of Law

University of Alberta alumni

University of Toronto Faculty of Law alumni
Academic staff of the Dalhousie University
Canadian legal scholars

Year of birth missing (living people)
Living people